Eomys is an extinct genus of eomyid rodent from the late Oligocene of France, Germany, Spain, and possibly Turkey. The species Eomys quercyi is the earliest known gliding rodent.

References

External links
 Eomys in the Paleobiology Database

Geomyoid rodents
Prehistoric rodent genera
Gliding animals
Oligocene rodents
Oligocene mammals of Asia
Oligocene mammals of Europe
Paleogene France
Fossils of France
Quercy Phosphorites Formation
Fossil taxa described in 1884